Tim Nelemans (born 31 May 1982 in Eindhoven) is a Dutch former professional footballer who played as a forward for Eerste Divisie club FC Oss. Nelemans also played for FC Eindhoven from 2001 to 2010.

References

External links
 

Living people
1982 births
Footballers from Eindhoven
Dutch footballers
Association football forwards
Eerste Divisie players
TOP Oss players
FC Eindhoven players